Cobria is a genus of longhorn beetles of the subfamily Lamiinae, containing the following species:

 Cobria albisparsa Pascoe, 1865
 Cobria biroi Breuning, 1953
 Cobria fuscostictica Breuning, 1970
 Cobria rufa Breuning, 1961
 Cobria transversevittata Breuning, 1979

References

Pteropliini